A mathematical constant is a key number whose value is fixed by an unambiguous definition, often referred to by a symbol (e.g., an alphabet letter), or by mathematicians' names to facilitate using it across multiple mathematical problems. For example, the constant π may be defined as the ratio of the length of a circle's circumference to its diameter. The following list includes a decimal expansion and set containing each number, ordered by year of discovery.

The column headings may be clicked to sort the table alphabetically, by decimal value, or by set. Explanations of the symbols in the right hand column can be found by clicking on them.

List

Mathematical constants sorted by their representations as continued fractions 

The following list includes the continued fractions of some constants and is sorted by their representations. Continued fractions with more than 20 known terms have been truncated, with an ellipsis to show that they continue. Rational numbers have two continued fractions; the version in this list is the shorter one. Decimal representations are rounded or padded to 10 places if the values are known.

Sequences from constants

See also 
Invariant (mathematics)
Glossary of mathematical symbols
List of mathematical symbols by subject
List of numbers
List of physical constants
Particular values of the Riemann zeta function
Physical constant

Notes

References

Site MathWorld Wolfram.com

Site OEIS.org

Site OEIS Wiki

Bibliography 

  English translation by Catriona and David Lischka.

Further reading

External links
 Inverse Symbolic Calculator, Plouffe's Inverter
 Constants - from Wolfram MathWorld
 On-Line Encyclopedia of Integer Sequences (OEIS)
 Steven Finch's page of mathematical constants
 Xavier Gourdon and Pascal Sebah's page of numbers, mathematical constants and algorithms

mathematical constants
Constants
Articles containing video clips
constants
Continued fractions